Bear Creek is a river near Brethren, Michigan.

References

Wild and Scenic Rivers of the United States
Rivers of Michigan